Las Trampas or just Trampas (Spanish: "traps"), is a small unincorporated town in Taos County, New Mexico. Founded in 1751, its center retains the original early Spanish colonial defensive layout from that time, as well as the 18th-century San José de Gracia Church, one of the finest surviving examples of Spanish Colonial church architecture in the United States. The village center was designated a National Historic Landmark District (the Las Trampas Historic District) in 1967.

Geography
Las Trampas is located on the scenic High Road to Taos (New Mexico State Road 76) in the Sangre de Cristo Mountains. it is approximately halfway between Santa Fe to the south and Taos to the north.

The town has a post office, with the ZIP code 87576; the US Postal Service prefers the name "Trampas". No ZIP Code Tabulation Area information for 87576 is available from Census 2000.

History

After several failed attempts, Santo Tomas Apostol del Rio de Las Trampas was founded in 1751 by 12 families from Santa Fe. The genízaros were also Indians, but detribalized and with a history of serving as slaves and servants of the Spanish colonists. They were important in the frontier defense of New Mexico. For the genízaros, relocation to Trampas and other frontier settlements was a means of acquiring land. Also among the early settlers were Tlaxcalans, Mexican Indians who had a long history of assisting the Spanish, and mestizos.

The small community consisted of little more than the central plaza, ringed by houses, which were surrounded by a low adobe wall. The village grew despite attacks from Native Americans, and by 1776 there were 63 families and 278 inhabitants recorded. The people in that year were described as "a ragged lot...as festive as they [were] poor, and very merry." They spoke "local Spanish" mingled with the Tanoan language of the Taos Pueblo and most spoke some words of the Comanche, Ute, and Apache languages. The village remained largely isolated, except for travelers on the mountain road, until the 1920s.

The town is well known for the San José de Gracia Church, built between 1760 and 1776 and considered a model of the adobe colonial Spanish missions in New Mexico.

Historic district
The Las Trampas Historic Historic District, designated in 1967, encompasses the central village, whose buildings largely follow the plan originally laid out in 1751. Most of the buildings themselves date to the 19th century, often with late 19th-century alterations. The church, itself a National Historic Landmark for its architecture, is the only surviving 18th-century building. The original defensive wall that surrounded the village has been removed, and no significant traces of it remain.

Gallery

See also

 National Register of Historic Places listings in Taos County, New Mexico
 List of National Historic Landmarks in New Mexico

References

External links 

 NPS National Historical Districts: Las Trampas Historic District webpage
 Las Trampas photos at the Library of Congress
 NPS National Historical Landmarks: San José de Gracia (church) webpage
 Archive.org: The Architecture of San José de Gracia
 American Southwest, a National Park Service Discover Our Shared Heritage Travel Itinerary

Towns in Taos County, New Mexico
Unincorporated communities in New Mexico
National Historic Landmarks in New Mexico
Populated places established in 1751
1751 establishments in New Spain
Sangre de Cristo Mountains
Spanish-American culture in New Mexico
Historic districts on the National Register of Historic Places in New Mexico
National Register of Historic Places in Taos County, New Mexico